La Mazière-aux-Bons-Hommes is a commune in the Creuse department in the Nouvelle-Aquitaine region in central France.

Geography
The commune is bordered to the east by the department of Allier.

Population

Sights
 The nineteenth-century church.

See also
Communes of the Creuse department

References

Communes of Creuse